GIIR was established in 2004 and is Korea’s first advertising group holding company engaged in investment and management consulting for its subsidiaries, which specialize in advertising and media communications, including advertising, media, and out-of-home advertising (OOH) advertising.  GIIR has established a marketing communications group that consists of a number of advertising and media agencies. It is a subsidiary of LG Corporation.

Subsidiaries
HS Ad, ad creation and advertising agency
LBEST, advertising agency
W Brandconnection Co, advertising agency
Bugs Com Ad, OOH media such as bus advertising
Alchemedia, mMedia agency
G Outdoor, OOH media agency
TAMS Media, OOH advertising such as subway lighting ads
Beijing Yuanzhimeng Advertising Co., Ltd, advertising agency
GIIR America, Inc, advertising agency

External links
G2R Official Website
Dr Backlinks Website
Canlı Tv Website
Pet Care Advice, Tips, Product Reviews
Haartransplantatie Website
TV Hosting
ip kamera canlı yayın
Trabzon Haber
Trabzonspor Haber

Advertising agencies of South Korea
LG Corporation